HTMS may refer to:
The ICAO code of Moshi Airport, an airport in northeastern Tanzania 
Initialism of His Thai Majesty's Ship, the ship prefix for ships in the Royal Thai Navy
Hewitt-Trussville Middle School, Alabama, United States